Imelda Kennedy is a camogie player, winner of an All-Star award in 2006. She was a member of the Kilkenny team that won the All-Ireland Senior Camogie Championship in 1994, and won All Ireland Club Championship medals with St Lachtain’s, Freshford in 2004, 2005 and 2006 and All Ireland titles with Kilkenny at minor level, as well as two Leinster junior medals, two All-Ireland club medals, four Leinster Club medals and eight county championships with her club. 
She won All Ireland medals at second-level college and Féile na nGael level.

References

External links
 Profile in Cúl4kidz magazine

Living people
Kilkenny camogie players
Year of birth missing (living people)